Ciro Procuna Naveda is a Mexican sports announcer for ESPN Deportes (ESPN in Spanish in the United States). He is the presenter of Futbol Picante and NFL Semanal. Procuna has also worked as co-host on SportsCenter on ESPN in Spanish.

External links
Biography at ESPN Deportes 

Living people
National Football League announcers
Year of birth missing (living people)
Monterrey Institute of Technology and Higher Education alumni